Richland Center is the name of several places in the United States:

Richland Center, Indiana
Richland Center, Wisconsin
Richland Center Township